Joseph Reiff (June 5, 1911 – February 9, 1988) was an American basketball player and referee.  He was a three-time All-American center at Northwestern University.

Reiff, a 6'3 (1.91 m) center from Crane Technical High School in Chicago, chose to attend nearby Northwestern University and play for Hall of Fame coach Dutch Lonborg.  Reiff led the Wildcats to a Western Conference championship in his sophomore year.  Reiff led the league in scoring with a 10.0 average.  Northwestern finished 13-1 (11-1 in league play) and would later be retroactively named 1931 National Champions by the Helms Athletic Foundation and Reiff was named a consensus All-American.

In his junior year, Reiff finished second in the conference in scoring to Purdue senior John Wooden.  In his senior year, Reiff again led Northwestern to a conference title and led the league in scoring for a second time at 14.0 points per game.  He was once again named a consensus All-American

After graduating from Northwestern, Reiff played for Rosenberg-Avery of Chicago in the Amateur Athletic Union (AAU) and was named to the All-AAU team.  He then became a basketball referee in the Western Conference from 1937-1947.

Joe Reiff was a charter inductee into the Northwestern athletics Hall of Fame, elected in 1984.

References

1911 births
1988 deaths
All-American college men's basketball players
Amateur Athletic Union men's basketball players
American men's basketball players
Basketball players from Illinois
Basketball players from Oklahoma
Basketball referees
Centers (basketball)
Northwestern Wildcats men's basketball players
People from Whitewater, Wisconsin